Sydney John Webb (6 January 1906 – January 1994), commonly known as Stan Webb, was an English professional footballer who made more than 200 Football League appearances playing as a goalkeeper for Brighton & Hove Albion.

Life and career
Webb was born in Portslade-by-Sea, Sussex, in 1906. He worked at the local gasworks, and played football for his works team and for Sussex County League team Hove before turning professional with Brighton & Hove Albion in 1924. He spent the next season with Tunbridge Wells Rangers of the Kent League, and made 24 first-team appearances for Albion in 1925–26. He then lost his place to the experienced Skilly Williams, but regained it in late 1928, and was undisputed first choice until the arrival of Joe Duckworth, with whom he enjoyed a rivalry for the position until Duckworth moved on in 1932. Webb made his 234th and final first-team appearance for Albion in 1934, returned to Tunbridge Wells Rangersby then a Southern League teamin 1935, and finished his career at Southwick. After the war, he emigrated to Australia, where he died in January 1994.

References

1906 births
1994 deaths
People from Hove
Association football goalkeepers
English footballers
Hove United F.C. players
Brighton & Hove Albion F.C. players
Tunbridge Wells F.C. players
Southwick F.C. players
English Football League players
Southern Football League players
Date of death missing